Agnes (before 1260 – after 1279) was a natural daughter of Bohemian king Ottokar II with his mistress Agnes of Kuenring.

She married Bohemian nobleman Bavor II of Strakonice. They had three children, Bavor III, Mikuláš and Vilém.

After his death she married Borsa Kàrolyi.

Bibliography 

SVOBODA, Miroslav. Páni ze Strakonic : vládci Prácheňska a dobrodinci johanitů. Praha : Nakladatelství Lidové noviny, 2010. .

Přemyslid dynasty
13th-century Bohemian women
Year of birth uncertain